William Joseph Stratton (January 28, 1886 – May 8, 1938) was an American politician. His son William Grant Stratton was born in Ingleside, Lake County, Ill., on February 26, 1914.

Early life 
Born in Ingleside, Illinois, Lake County, Ill., January 28, 1886 to John Stratton and Mary O'Boyle Stratton. 

Stratton was a farmer and an Illinois state game warden. Illinois Governor William Stratton was his son. He served as a township supervisor and was a Republican.

Political career 
He served as first director of the Illinois Department of Conservation. From 1929 until 1933, Stratton served as Illinois Secretary of State. Stratton died in Ingleside, Illinois.

William J. Stratton served as Republican Secretary of state of Illinois from 1929 to 1933; being defeated for reelecting in 1936. He was a candidate for Illinois state treasurer in 1934, and a Member of the Elks, Woodmen, and Freemasons.

Death 
He died in Ingleside, Lake County, Ill., on May 8, 1938 (age 52 years, 100 days) and was interred at North Shore Garden of Memories, North Chicago, Ill.

Notes

1886 births
1938 deaths
People from Lake County, Illinois
Farmers from Illinois
Illinois Republicans
Secretaries of State of Illinois
20th-century American politicians